was a town located in Atetsu District, Okayama Prefecture, Japan.

As of 2003, the town had an estimated population of 3,922 and a density of 32.35 persons per km2. The total area was 121.25 km2.

On March 31, 2005, Ōsa, along with the towns of Shingō, Tessei and Tetta (all from Atetsu District), was merged into the expanded city of Niimi.

Dissolved municipalities of Okayama Prefecture